Dave Sukhdip Singh Hayer (born 1958) is a Canadian former politician for the province of British Columbia. He served as Member of the Legislative Assembly (MLA) for Surrey-Tynehead from May 2001 to May 2013. Hayer is an Indo-Canadian who is the son of assassinated journalist, Tara Singh Hayer.

Education 
Hayer earned a Bachelor of Arts degree in Business Administration from Simon Fraser University (1979–1982) and completed Strategic Leadership Certificate from University of British Columbia Sauder School of Business, Executive Management (2013–2014). He also attended Douglas College from 1977 to 1979 and completed the Tax Course at British Columbia Institute of Technology (BCIT).

Business and community involvement 
Hayer served as the general manager of the Canadian Accounting Aggregates Public Accountants from 1983 to 1988, following which he joined the Indo-Canadian Times. Before his election to public office, Hayer was a Surrey businessperson, Assistant Publisher of the Indo-Canadian Times, Kwantlen University College Governor, real estate agent, and worked in the restaurant, newspaper, construction, transportation and forestry industries. In addition, Hayer has worked as a labourer in a steel factory and during his teenage years worked on farms, in greenhouses, in a grocery store and even delivered both the Sun and Province newspapers.

Hayer's memberships have included the Rotary Club of Surrey, Cloverdale Royal Canadian Legion, Surrey Board of Trade, the Cloverdale District Chamber of Commerce, and Greater Langley Chamber of Commerce, Langley Salvation Army Gateway of Hope, Cloverdale Community Association, Cloverdale Rodeo & Exhibition Association. He is also a member of Simon Fraser University's India Advisory Council, which supports SFU's strategic initiatives in India and engagement with BC's Indo-Canadian diaspora.

in July 2019, Dave and Isabelle Martinez Hayer were elected as co-presidents of the Rotary Club of Surrey. Both took the oath from Brad Whittaker, Governor of the Rotary International District 5050.

In October 2018 Hayer was elected vice president of the Association of Former MLAs of BC (formerly Association of Ex-MLAs of B.C.) a non partisan association of former MLAs founded in 1987 

Previous community and business involvements include the Rotary Club of Surrey president (1999–2000); Surrey Community Crime Prevention Society president (1995–96); Surrey Chamber of Commerce president (1996–97); Surrey Board of Trade Governor since 1997; BC Chamber of Commerce District director (1999–2001) for Langley to Vancouver region; Vancouver Board of Trade Small Business Council member (1995–2000); Indo-Canadian Business Association vice-president (1993–2000); Ethnic Press Association of BC director & vice-president (1991–99); City of Surrey Economic Development Strategy Advisory Committee member (1995–2000); South Fraser Child Development Centre Christmas Party chair (1988–2001); and Surrey & White Rock Home Support Association director (1994–95). As well, Hayer created the Surrey Police Officer of the Year Awards and initiated the building of the Surrey Chamber of Commerce (now Surrey Board of Trade) Building.
 
Hayer currently works with the Dominion Lending Centres. He previously worked with the Canadian Imperial Bank of Commerce (CIBC) as a mortgage advisor.

Politics 
After defeating Doug McCallum, the Mayor of Surrey, for the BC Liberal party nomination, Hayer competed for and was elected as the first Member of the Legislative Assembly of British Columbia for the riding of Surrey-Tynehead. The riding includes the Guildford, Fraser Heights, Fleetwood, Port Kells, and Tynehead areas. Hayer was first elected in the 2001 provincial general election and was re-elected in 2005 and 2009.

Hayer served as the Parliamentary Secretary for Multiculturalism and Immigration from 2005 to 2011. He was noted as a voice for moderate Sikhs in Greater Vancouver and as a consistent critic of terrorism and Sikh extremism. In 2010, an official with the Dashmesh Darbar Gurdwara (Sikh temple) that is extremely vocal in their support for the Khalistani separatist movement, advised Hayer and moderate Federal Sikh politician Ujjal Dosanjh that their attendance at an annual Sikh religious parade would be at their own risk; this prompted a police investigation, and prompted then-Premier Gordon Campbell to ask temple officials to apologize and Surrey mayor Dianne Watts to consider a review of the status of the following year's parade.

On July 7, 2012, Hayer announced that he would not seek re-election in the May 2013 provincial election. "Part of that decision was that if re-elected as MLA in May 2013, and then leave to run as an MP in 2015, it would have triggered an expensive by-election which would be costly for my constituents & that would have been the wrong thing to do for my community," noted Hayer.

In 2013, Hayer criticized the Liberal government's Quick Wins ethnic outreach scandal.

Hayer's attempt to be nominated by the Conservative Party of Canada for the 2015 federal election in the riding of Cloverdale—Langley City was defeated in November 2014 by Dean Drysdale.

On July 19, 2021, Hayer had announced he was nominated by the Conservative Party of Canada for the 2021 Canadian federal election in the riding of Fleetwood—Port Kells. During his announcement, he said, "We need leadership at the federal level once again to secure the future and get the economy back on track post-pandemic". Hayer's campaign will focus on getting the federal debt under control and jobs.

Awards and recognition 

In 2000, Hayer and his wife Isabelle Martinez Hayer accepted an award for his late father Tara Singh Hayer as one of International Press Institute's 50 World Press Freedom Heroes's of the past 50 years. An award for Tara Singh Hayer as a World Press Freedom Hero presented by US Senator Ted Kennedy in Boston was accepted by Dave & Isabelle Martinez Hayer in May 2000 on behalf of the Hayer family.

In 2002, Hayer was a recipient of Her Majesty Queen Elizabeth II's Golden Jubilee medal to commemorate the fiftieth anniversary of Her Majesty's reign as Queen of Canada.

Hayer was an advocate for accountability for terrorists.

In 2007, Hayer received a Pravasi Bharatia Samman Award from the Government of India, which is given annually to people of Indian heritage no longer living in India, who have achieved excellence in their chosen fields of endeavour. The award was presented by A. P. J. Abdul Kalam, the President of India, at a ceremony in New Delhi, India for Hayer's "active leadership in the community, his contributions to public service and for his achievements in government." Hayer was the second Canadian to be presented with this honour.

In 2008, Hayer was included by the Vancouver Sun in its list of the 100 topmost influential Canadians of South Asian descent making a difference in BC.

On February 10, 2013, Hayer was presented with a Diamond Jubilee Medal by the Canadian Coalition Against Terror (C-CAT) for his contributions to the advancement of sound public policy on terrorism issues in Canada.

In 2017, Hayer was honoured with the presentation of his 3rd Paul Harris Award on July 10, 2017, by Surrey Rotary Officers.

Dave Hayer was awarded the Queen Elizabeth II's Platinum Jubilee Medal on October 11, 2022 for his outstanding service to the community.

Personal life
Hayer has lived in Surrey since 1972. He married Isabelle Martinez Hayer in 1981. They have four children: Alexander, Sonia, Anthony and Katrina.

Tara Singh Hayer (Nov. 15, 1936 - Nov. 18, 1998) was an Indo-Canadian Times newspaper editor and publisher, who was assassinated in Surrey Canada on November 18, 1998, after reporting about terrorism. He was recognized with hundreds of local, provincial, federal and international awards.Journalist Tara Singh Hayer's assassination still unresolved 20 years after fatal shooting.Tara Singh Hayer and the 'incentive to kill' - Twenty years ago, a journalist's death helped push Canada's biggest terrorism case into a ditch.

References 

 Official web site
 MLA Legislative Assembly of BC Website 

1958 births
Living people
British Columbia Institute of Technology alumni
British Columbia Liberal Party MLAs
Businesspeople from British Columbia
Canadian newspaper publishers (people)
Canadian people of Indian descent
Canadian real estate agents
Conservative Party of Canada candidates for the Canadian House of Commons
People from Surrey, British Columbia
Simon Fraser University alumni
University of British Columbia alumni
21st-century Canadian politicians
Recipients of Pravasi Bharatiya Samman